Donald Cobley (17 October 1928 – 1999) was a British modern pentathlete. He competed at the 1956 and 1960 Summer Olympics.

References

1928 births
1999 deaths
British male modern pentathletes
Olympic modern pentathletes of Great Britain
Modern pentathletes at the 1956 Summer Olympics
Modern pentathletes at the 1960 Summer Olympics
People from Hinckley
Sportspeople from Leicestershire
20th-century British people